F. W. Wait House is a historic home located at Glens Falls, Warren County, New York.  It was built about 1876 and is a rectangular, -story, brick residence with a slate mansard roof in a transitional Italianate / Second Empire style.  It retains many of its original decorative details.

It was added to the National Register of Historic Places in 1984.

See also
 National Register of Historic Places listings in Warren County, New York

References

Houses on the National Register of Historic Places in New York (state)
Second Empire architecture in New York (state)
Italianate architecture in New York (state)
Houses completed in 1876
Houses in Warren County, New York
National Register of Historic Places in Warren County, New York